Skythrenchelys is a genus of eels in the snake eel family Ophichthidae.

Species
There are currently 2 recognized species in this genus:
 Skythrenchelys macrostoma (Bleeker, 1864) (Large-mouth angry worm eel) 
 Skythrenchelys zabra Castle & J. E. McCosker, 1999 (Angry worm eel)

References

Ophichthidae